The 38th Annual Daytime Emmy Awards were held on Sunday, June 19, 2011, at the Las Vegas Hilton, and were televised on CBS. The Daytime Entertainment Creative Arts Emmy Awards were presented two days earlier on June 17 at the Westin Bonaventure Hotel.

The televised ceremony was hosted by Wayne Brady. The Pre-Nominations were announced on February 25, and the final nominations were announced May 11, 2011. At the event, Pat Sajak and Alex Trebek both received a Lifetime Achievement Award.

Nominations and winners
The following is a partial list of nominees and winners. Winners are listed first and highlighted in boldface.

Programs

Acting

Hosting

Production

Special awards

Outstanding Sound Editing - Live Action and Animation
Thomas McGurk, Dave Howe, Sam Gray and Michael McAuliffe (Biz Kid$)
Joe Franco, Jeff Malinowski and Matt Longoria (The Electric Company)
Gordon Sproule, Jeff Davis and Johnny Ludgate (Hot Wheels: Battle Force 5)
Paulette Victor-Lifton, Matthew Thomas Hall, Jimmy Lifton, Ian Nyeste, Michael Petak, D.J. Lynch, Aran Tanchum, Dominick Certo and Lawrence Reyes (The Penguins of Madagascar)
Joe Pleiman and Patrick Downie (WordGirl)

Outstanding Music Direction and Composition
Adam Berry (The Penguins of Madagascar)
J. Walter Hawkes, Larry Hochman and Jeffrey Lesser (Wonder Pets)
Sarah Durkee, Paul Jacobs and Christopher Cerf (Between the Lions)
Mike Himelstein and Michael Turner (Mickey Mouse Clubhouse)
Brian Tyler (Transformers: Prime)
Jean-Christophe Prudhomme and Laurent Bertaud (The Garfield Show)

Outstanding Animated Program
Bob Schooley, Mark McCorkle, Bret Haaland, Chris Neuhahn, Dean Hoff and Dina Buteyn (The Penguins of Madagascar)
David Wilcox, Brian Grazer, Dorothea Gillim, Ellen Cockrill, Share Stallings, Matthew Baughman, Carol Greenwald, Ron Howard, Paul Higgins, David Kirschner, Jon Shapiro and Jacqui Deegan (Curious George)
Kok Cheong Wong, Sue Bea Montgomery, Lisa Henson, Brian Henson, Jyotimoy Saha, Craig Bartlett and Halle Stanford-Grossman (Dinosaur Train)
Janice Burgess, Jonny Belt, Sara Kamen, Ellen Martin, Robert Scull, Scott Dyer, Pamela Lehn, Jennifer Hill and Lynne Warner (The Backyardigans)
Halle Stanford-Grossman, Joyce Campbell, Bradley Zweig, Lisa Henson and Chris Plourde (Sid the Science Kid)

Outstanding Performer In An Animated Program
Danny Jacobs (King Julien, The Penguins of Madagascar)
Steven Tyler (The Mad Hatter, The Wonder Pets: Adventures in Wonderland)
Tom McGrath (Skipper, The Penguins of Madagascar)
Martin Short (The Cat in the Hat, The Cat in the Hat Knows a Lot About That!)
Bill Farmer (Goofy, Mickey Mouse Clubhouse)
Peter Cullen (Optimus Prime, Transformers: Prime)

Outstanding Casting for an Animated Series or Special
Meredith Layne (The Penguins of Madagascar)
Aaron Drown (Kick Buttowski: Suburban Daredevil)
Meredith Layne (Fanboy & Chum Chum)

Outstanding Writing in Animation
Bob Roth, Bill Motz and Brandon Sawyer (The Penguins of Madagascar)
John N. Huss, Ryan Raddatz, Tom Martin, Carla Filisha, Jack Ferraiolo and Eric Ledgin (WordGirl)
P. Kevin Strader, Gentry Menzel, David Steven Cohen, Peter K. Hirsch and Jonathan Greenberg (Arthur)
Marsha F. Griffin, Joseph Kuhr, Nicole Dubuc, Steven Melching and Duane Capizzi (Transformers: Prime)
Tom Sheppard, Gene Grillo and Dan Serafin (Back at the Barnyard)
Elise Allen, Joseph Purdy and Craig Bartlett (Dinosaur Train)

Outstanding Directing in an Animated Program
Chris Savino and Sherm Cohen (Kick Buttowski: Suburban Daredevil)
Brian Sheesley, Jim Schumann, Russell Calabrese and Ginny McSwain (Fanboy & Chum Chum)
Dallas Parker, Colleen Holub and Terry Klassen (Martha Speaks) 
Nick Filippi, Christo Stamboliev, Dave Knott, Steve Loter and Lisa Schaffer (The Penguins of Madagascar)
Christian Larocque, Graham MacDonald, Emmanuelle Gignac and Dee Shipley (Toot & Puddle)
David Hartman, Shaunt Nigoghossian, Todd Waterman, Vinton Heuck and Susan Blu  (Transformers: Prime)

Outstanding Special Class Animated Program
Steve Oedekerk, Jed Spingarn, Paul Marshal and Kyle Jolly (Back at the Barnyard)
Eric Robles, Steve Tompkins, Fred Seibert, Shaun Cashman, Jason Meier, Therese Trujillo, Dean Hoff and MacGregor Middleton (Fanboy & Chum Chum)

Lifetime Achievement Awards
 Pat Sajak
 Alex Trebek

Special tributes
 The Oprah Winfrey Show
 Susan Lucci

References

Award shows by Associated Television International
038
Daytime Emmy Awards
Emmy Awards
Daytime Emmy Awards 38